Conotalopia mustelina is a species of sea snail, a marine gastropod mollusk in the family Trochidae, the top snails.

Description
The height of the shell attains 3 mm, its diameter 4 mm. The thin, small shell has a globose-conical shape. It is concentrically striated. Its ground color is white, covered with brown checkered spirals. The four whorls are ventricose with a bluntly angular periphery. The base of the shell is rounded and widely perforated. The aperture is ovate. The thin columella is arcuated.

Distribution
This marine species occurs off the Philippines and off Japan.

References

 Higo, S., Callomon, P. & Goto, Y. (1999). Catalogue and bibliography of the marine shell-bearing Mollusca of Japan. Osaka. : Elle Scientific Publications. 749 pp.

External links
 To World Register of Marine Species
 

mustelina
Gastropods described in 1861